The following is a list of films set in Tampa, Florida and surrounding areas:

 Anna in the Tropics (2002)
 Aquamarine (2006)
 Black Like Me (1964)
 China Moon (1994)
 Cocoon (1985)
 Cop and a Half (1993)
 Coupe de Ville
 Dolphin Tale (2011)
 Dolphin Tale 2 (2014)
 Edward Scissorhands (1990)
 Follow That Dream (1962)
 A Fonder Heart (2011)
 A Guy Named Joe (1943)
 Fear of Rain (2021)
 Goodfellas (1990)
 Grace Is Gone (2007)
 Great Expectations (1998)
 Live by Night (2016)
 Magic Mike (2012)
 Miss Peregrine's Home for Peculiar Children (2016)
 Parker (2013)
 The Infiltrator (2016)
 The Parent Trap II (1986)
 The Punisher (2004)
 Second Noah
 Sex Ed
 Spring Breakers (2012)
 Strategic Air Command (1955)
 Summer Rental (1985)
 Thunder in Paradise (1994)

See also
International Arts and Film Foundation
List of movies based on location

References

External links
Film and television industry in the Tampa Bay area
International Arts and Film Foundation Official Site

Tampa
Films